On 21 January 2000, Iran national football team played against an Asian all-star side, in an exhibition testimonial match for Iranian captain Nader Mohammadkhani. Iran's lanky striker Ali Daei scored a Hat-trick. Asian all-star's best chances were minute 42, when Ruslan Baltiev's header hit the woodwork and other missed opportunity was Esam Salem's minute 66 penalty that was saved by Davoud Fanaei. Also Mohammed bin Hammam was the official VIP guest.

Unused Players
The following players were members of the squads but did not get any game time

Iran
 Hadi Tabatabaei
 Javad Zarincheh
 Sohrab Bakhtiarizadeh
 Mahmoud Fekri
 Laith Nobari
 Hamid Reza Estili
 Javad Nekounam

Asia All-Stars
 Afshin Peyrovani
 Abbas Obeid Jassim
 Tawan Sripan
 Adel Oqla

References

Iran
Asia All-Stars Game
Iran national football team matches